Joseph Baly (1824–1909) was Archdeacon of Calcutta from 1872 until 1883;

Baly was educated at Worcester College, Oxford, graduating BA in 1846 and M.A. in 1857. He was ordained deacon in 1847 and priest in 1848. He served curacies in Leicester and Falmouth. In 1854 he became Warden of St Thomas's College, Colombo. He later served as Chaplain at Allahabad, Sealkote  and Simla before returning to Falmouth as its Rector (1870–1872). He was appointed a Fellow of the University of Calcutta in 1879. On his return from India he was  Chaplain of Windsor Great Park from 1885 until 1906.

He died on 6 November 1909.

His daughter Amelia Baly was the wife of Field Marshal Sir George White.

References

1824 births
1909 deaths
Alumni of Worcester College, Oxford
Fellows of the University of Calcutta
Archdeacons of Calcutta
Sri Lankan people of Indian descent